Romei may refer to:

 Angela Romei (born 1997), Italian curler 
 Carlo Romei (born 1999), Italian football player
 Carlo Romei (politician) (1924–1986), Italian politician
 Miriam Romei (born 1995), Italian professional racing cyclist
 Roberto Romei (1926–2013), Italian politician
 (born 1957), Italian footballer
 Robin Romei, British musical artist

See also 

 Romea (disambiguation)
 Romeis
 Romeo (disambiguation)